Church and 24th Street is a light rail stop on the Muni Metro J Church line, located in the Noe Valley neighborhood of San Francisco, California. The stop opened with the line on August 11, 1917. The station has two side platforms in the middle of Church Street (traffic islands) where passengers board or depart from trains. The station also has mini-high platforms providing access to people with disabilities.

In March 2014, Muni released details of the proposed implementation of their Transit Effectiveness Project (later rebranded MuniForward), which included a variety of stop changes for the J Church line. Under that plan, a traffic light would replace the stop signs at the intersection of Church Street and 24th Street; the platforms would be moved to the far side of the intersection in each direction, allowing trains to pass through the signal without stopping.

References

External links 

SFMTA – Church St and 24th St inbound and outbound
SFBay Transit (unofficial) – Church St & 24th St

Muni Metro stations
Railway stations in the United States opened in 1917